Kelechi Nwaneri (born 1994) is a self-taught mixed-media artist. He was born in Lagos. Kelechi creates art based on events happening in his environment. His work references Igbo iconography.

He graduated with a Bachelor's degree in Agricultural Extension from the University of Nigeria, Nsukka in 2015, and won the 2018 Spanish Embassy annual Visual Art Competition in Abuja, Nigeria. In 2020, he was the artist in Residence for AKKA PROJECT in Venice, Italy.

Exhibitions
Solo exhibitions

2021 Myths Kristin Hjellegjerde Berlin

2020 "Modern marks" Ebony/curated Cape Town, South Africa

References 

1994 births
Living people
Artists from Lagos
21st-century Nigerian artists